The Moselle Hills form a ridge, up to , on the left bank of the river Moselle between Reil and Schweich in the Rhineland-Palatinate counties of Bernkastel-Wittlich and Trier-Saarburg. There are vineyards on the southern slopes of the wooded hills. They lie on the southern edge of the Eifel region.

Geography

Location 
The Moselle Hills lie between the village Reil in the northeast and the town of Schweich in the southwest and run past the wine village of Piesport northwest along the Moselle, the aforementioned settlements all lying on the river itself.

Natural regional grouping 
From a natural regional perspective, the Moselle Hills belong to the major unit group, the Moselle Valley (Moseltal, No. 25) and in the major unit of Middle Moselle Valley (Mittleres Moseltal, No. 250). The natural regional sub-unit of the Moselle Hills (Moselberge, 250.2) are separated  from the Moselle Eifel major unit (270) (also part of the Eifel) to the northwest by the major unit of the Wittlich Basin (Wittlicher Senke, 251).

Hills 
The hills and high points of the Moselle Hills – sorted by their height in metres (m) above sea level (NHN) include the:
 Schimmelsberg aufm Hüttenberg (434.1 m), around 1.7 km north of Piesport in the parish of Minheim
 Monzeler Hüttenkopf (423.4 m, west of Monzel)
 Mehringer Berg (418.7 m, northwest of Mehring)
 Hansenberg (401.8 m), east of Rivenich
 Thomasberg (382.9 m), south of Klausen
 Rothenberg (365.3 m), east of Wengerohr
 Stöppelberg, northeast of Klausen
 Rudemberg, west of Klüsserath
 (Noviander) Hüttenkopf, west of Noviand
 Geisberg (262 m), south of Mülheim on Moselle

Rivers 
The southern part of the Moselle Hills is bisected in a north-south direction by a stretch of the Salm, and the Lieser cuts through its northern part from northwest to southeast. Both rivers are tributaries of the Moselle.

References 

Hill ranges of Germany
Central Uplands
Landscapes of Rhineland-Palatinate